At Home Abroad is a revue with music by Arthur Schwartz and lyrics by Howard Dietz.  It introduced the songs "Love Is a Dancing Thing", "What a Wonderful World" and "Got a Bran' New Suit", among others.  The revue follows a bored couple who flee America and go on a musical world tour.

Productions
The original Broadway production opened at the Winter Garden Theatre on September 19, 1935, and ran for 198 performances. It featured in the cast Beatrice Lillie, Ethel Waters, Herb Williams, Eleanor Powell, Paul Haakon, Reginald Gardiner, Eddie Foy Jr., Vera Allen, and John Payne . 
Sketches were scripted by Raymond Knight, Marc Connelly and others. The revue was produced by Messrs. Shubert, and directed by Vincente Minnelli and Thomas Mitchell; the first Broadway musical to be directed by Minnelli.

Synopsis 
The setting is a cruise around the world, featuring 25 musical numbers at various locations: a London store, an African jungle ("Hottentot Potentate"), a Balkan country where Powell taps spy messages, and a West Indies dockside for "Loadin' Time", to mention a few.  The revue gave Bea Lillie the range of a variety of exotic locations. She had the tongue-twister lines "two dozen double damask dinner napkins"; became a Russian ballerina who could not "face the mujik"; and disrupted the line of geisha girls with "It's better with your shoes off" in a Japanese garden. In "Paree", she was a Parisian grisette in the Moulin Rouge in Paris, and "made something of a carnival of this song, with lyrics like 'I want to kiss your right bank, kiss your left bank; kiss Montparnasse' with the emphasis on the last syllable."

Musical numbers
Get Away From it All 
The Survey 
Dinner Napkins  - Eddie Foy, Jr, James McColl
Hottentot Potentate - Ethel Waters
Paree - Beatrice Lillie
Thief in the Night - Ethel Waters
Love Is a Dancing Thing - Paul Haakon, Woods Miller, Nina Whitney
Loadin' Time  - Ethel Waters
Trains - Reginald Gardiner 
What a Wonderful World - Eleanor Powell
You May Be Far Away From Me - Beatrice Lillie, Reginald Gardiner  
The Steamboat Whistle - Ethel Waters 
Get Yourself a Geisha
Got a Bran' New Suit - Eleanor Powell, Ethel Waters
That's Not Cricket
The Lady With the Tap - Eleanor Powell, Woods Miller
Farewell, my lovely - Paul Haakon, Woods Miller, Nina Whitney

References

External links
At Home Abroad at the IBDB database
Time magazine review
Information about the cast album

1935 musicals
Broadway musicals
Revues
Musicals by Arthur Schwartz